Wolfpit Branch is a  long 2nd order tributary to the Swannanoa River in Buncombe County, North Carolina.

Course
Wolfpit Branch rises about 3 miles south of Black Mountain, North Carolina in Buncombe County on the Broad River divide.  Wolfpit Branch then flows north to meet the Swannanoa River at Black Mountain, North Carolina.

Watershed
Wolfpit Branch drains  of area, receives about 50.0 in/year of precipitation, has a topographic wetness index of 275.42 and is about 91% forested.

References

Rivers of North Carolina
Bodies of water of Buncombe County, North Carolina